The Brit Award for British Artist of the Year is an award given by the British Phonographic Industry (BPI), an organisation which represents record companies and artists in the United Kingdom. The accolade is presented at the Brit Awards, an annual celebration of British and international music. The winners and nominees are determined by the Brit Awards voting academy with over one thousand members, which comprise record labels, publishers, managers, agents, media, and previous winners and nominees.

The current holder of the award is Harry Styles, who won in 2023.

History
The category was introduced in 2022 and combined the previous categories for British Female Solo Artist and British Male Solo Artist. The restructuring of these categories was a result of the Academy's wish to eliminate the distinctions between male and female artists and replace it with new gender-neutral category. This category is intended to honour solo artists, as groups are still nominated in the British Group category.

Eligibility
In order to be eligible for the Artist of the Year award, "an artist must have achieved at least one top 40 album or two top 20 singles" during the Brits eligibility period, which generally runs from early December of one year to a similar date of the following year (e.g. the eligibility period for the 2023 Brit awards was 10 December 2021 to 9 December 2022). To determine the nominees for the category, record labels are invited to submit their eligible artists for consideration for the members of the BPI to vote on. Each of the approximately 1,200 members chooses their personal top five in order of preference and the votes are counted to produce the shortlist of five nominees.

Winners and nominees

Multiple awards winners
Totals include nominees for British Male Artist or Best British Female Artist.

Controversy 
In 2023, the awards attracted controversy due to all five nominees for the solo award being male.

See also
Brit Award for International Solo Artist

Notes
 Adele (2008) also won the Brit Award for Rising Star
 Adele (2012, 2016) also won the Brit Award for British Female Solo Artist

References

Brit Awards
Awards established in 2022